Dragon's Eye: A Chinese Noir is a novel written by Andy Oakes and published in 2004. It draws heavily on noir influences, particularly the hardboiled detective aspect of film noir and has been referenced as neo-noir novel.

Reviews

Dragon's Eye has been reviewed by Kirkus as "falling victim to excessive length and intrusive, improbable American politics". It has a middling GoodReads rating of 3.26, with the consensus being "Quite clichéd and about 200 pages too long. This is not a bad story - just long-winded and with unnecessary 'plot twists' added".

Plot summary
The protagonist of the story is Sun Piao, a Chief Investigator of the Shanghai Public Security Bureau Homicide Department. He has a sidekick of sorts, an overweight and spirited rural Chinese, Yaobang. Sun Piao is a jaded, righteous man determined to do his job and with a reputation for being good at it; alternatively, he is the archetypical hardboiled detective of film noir: cynical, pessimistic and somewhat self-destructive.

The storyline of the book revolves around an investigation of several horrifically - but surgically - mutilated corpses, all chained around their necks and ankles, and one night resting on the muddy banks of the Huangpu, near the Bund.

Other characters in the book worth noting are Barbara Hayes - an American politician who goes to Shanghai in search of her missing son, Chief Liping (a Party member several grades higher than Sun) and an Englishman named Charles Haven.

Notes

2004 novels
British crime novels